William Mackay or MacKay may refer to:
 William Mackay (artist) (1876–1939), American artist
 William Andrew MacKay (1929–2013), Canadian lawyer, judge and university president
 William Paton Mackay (1839–1885), Scottish doctor, Presbyterian minister and hymn writer
 William MacKay (politician) (1847–1915), physician and political figure in Nova Scotia
 William Alexander Mackay (1860–1927), Scottish doctor who co-founded Spain's oldest football club, Recreativo de Huelva

See also 
William McKay (disambiguation)
William McKee (disambiguation)
William McKie (disambiguation)